Stingers (1998–2004) is an Australian police drama television series. It ran for eight seasons on the Nine Network before it was canceled in late 2004 due to declining ratings and the late timeslot Channel Nine gave the program. The series has also aired in 65 countries, including Canada, Denmark, Egypt, France, Gibraltar, Iran, Ireland, Belgium, Luxembourg, Netherlands, New Zealand, Norway, Poland, Portugal, South Africa, Spain, Sweden, Turkey, the United Kingdom, the United States and Papua New Guinea.

Inspired by true events, Stingers chronicled the cases of a deep undercover unit of the Victoria Police. The series also followed their personal lives, which sometimes became intertwined with their jobs. The show received average ratings during its debut season, but after some major changes, including intensive character development, the series became a success the following year. The original cast members include Peter Phelps, Joe Petruzzi, Kate Kendall, Ian Stenlake, Anita Hegh, and Jessica Napier. Phelps and Kendall were the only actors to remain with the show for its entire run.

Cast

 Senior Constable Peter Church – Peter Phelps (1998–2004, Ep 1 to 192)
 (Detective) Constable Angie Piper – Kate Kendall (1998–2004, Ep 1 to 192)
 Det-Sen Sgt. Bernie Rocca – Joe Petruzzi (1998–1999, Ep 1 to 44)
 Constable Oscar Stone – Ian Stenlake (1998–2002, Ep 1 to 110)
 Det-Sen Sgt. (originally Det-Sgt.) Ellen 'Mac' Mackenzie – Anita Hegh (1998–2002, Ep 1 to 110)
 Constable Daniella Mayo – Roxane Wilson (2000–2002, Ep 45 to 114)
 Detective Inspector Luke Harris – Gary Sweet (2002–2004, Ep 111 to 192)
 Constable (originally Probationary Constable) Christina Dichiera – Jacinta Stapleton (2002–2004, Ep 112 to 192)
 Senior Detective Leo Flynn – Daniel Frederiksen (2003–2004, Ep 136 to 192)

Semi-regulars and other cast
 Senior Detective (briefly demoted from Detective Inspector) Bill Hollister (Head of Homicide) – Nicholas Bell (Seasons 1–4)
 Det-Sen Sgt. Reg 'The Ferret' Masters (Head of Vice Squad/Head of Drugs Squad) – Richard Morgan (Seasons 2–8)
 Det. Stewart Campbell (Homicide Detective) – William Houten (Seasons 1–5)
 Det-Sen Sgt. Bryan Gray (Head of Armed Robbery/Senior Detective for Special Investigations) – Jeremy Kewley (Seasons 3–8)
 Det-Insp. Harry Love (Head of Homicide) – Martin Jacobs (Season 5)
 Det-Insp. Frank Callahan (Head of Homicide) – David Swann (Seasons 3–5)
 Det-Sen Sgt. Eric Chatterly (Senior Homicide Detective, possibly Acting Head of Homicide) – John Ridley (Seasons 2–8)
 Det. Nick Jardine  – Andy Rodoreda (Season 5)
 Marty Engle (Informant/Angie's Fiancé) – Jim Russell (Season 5)
 Det. Insp. Andrew Bligh (Internal Affairs) – Russell Kiefel (Seasons 3–7)
 Criminal Barrister Ingrid Burton – Rebecca Gibney (Seasons 6–7)
 Sophie Novak – Katrina Milosevic (Seasons 7–8)
 Detective Katherine Marks – Gigi Edgley (Season 8)
 Constable Megan Walsh – Lisa Chappell (Season 8)
 Samantha Piper – Angie's younger sister – Asher Keddie (Seasons 3–8)

Series history

On Sunday 16 July 2006 at 2 p.m., Executive producer John Wild and script producer Marcia Gardner sat down with an audience at ACMI in Federation Square in Melbourne to "explore the narrative arc and character development from the first episodes to the final series."  The event took place in the Screen Pit and was free to the public. Also in attendance was cast member Jeremy Kewley who posted the following rundown of the discussion for the Stingers forum:

It first began airing up towards the end of the year, on Monday nights. It was up against another new show on Channel Seven, Ally McBeal, and Stingers beat McBeal regularly for its first 11 weeks before it went on its Christmas ratings break. When both shows returned after the ratings break, McBeal began to win in the ratings quite comfortably, worrying Nine executives.

At this time Channel Nine and the producers had to work out how to win ratings back, and found that the reason why so many people preferred Ally McBeal over Stingers was because Stingers had a very rough, edgy and realistic feel to it, and that this did not appeal to women of all ages, who preferred the lightness of McBeal. So Stingers was moved to Tuesday night. This helped a bit, but not enough. Channel Nine were thinking about canceling the show, but Nine owner Kerry Packer liked the show and suggested that they keep it on the air. Nine did, but moved it an hour later to 9.30pm Tuesdays, and Stingers started to find its audience (although this was still not a big one). It stayed at this timeslot until the end of 7th season which seemed to be predominately male middle class white collar workers between the ages of 30–55.

By the middle of the second season, ratings were still not spectacular enough and Channel Nine commissioned research which showed that women were not particularly interested in Stingers. As women make up 50% of the audience the producers were told to make the first major change to Stingers: make it more female-friendly. This led to the departure of Joe Petruzzi, making Anita Hegh's character the boss of the Unit. This also led to another female character being introduced, undercover operative Danni Mayo, portrayed by Roxane Wilson. This led to the show becoming more 'lighter' to appeal to the female audiences. Soon after, humour was added to the show, in the form of Jeremy Kewley's character, Bryan Gray. These changes worked well and Stingers steamed through Seasons 3, 4 and 5, but then Anita Hegh and Ian Stenlake decided to leave the show, causing another drastic change in the series.

Channel Nine, on a nationwide cost-cutting drive, hinted at dropping the show because Stingers was considered too expensive; its budget had crept up from its original $440,000-per-episode cost, to around $480,000. They dropped a bombshell on the producers: shave around $130,000 every week from the budget or the show would have to cease production.  A huge ask, but everyone at Stingers was keen to keep going as everyone felt there were still life in the show and plenty of stories to tell.

By the start of the next season the budget was chopped down to $350,000 per episode. Shooting changed from six days per episode to five, stock changed from 16 mm film to SP Betacam Videotape, the crew became smaller, and writers were given less time to write each episode. The location changed from the "Crimplex" (warehouse/studio/offices by the Yarra River) to the studios of Channel Nine in Richmond. Channel Nine spent money on a big new set (plus a new "hospital ward" set and a new "pub/bar" set) and justified the cost by making sure that most of the action on the show now took place inside the studio on the new sets, with a lot less time spent on locations, with less money spent on car chases, stunts and special effects.

Channel Nine also wanted more "star power" in the show, so Gary Sweet was brought in as Luke Harris (and Roxane Wilson decided to leave), and Rebecca Gibney – now out of a job without Halifax f.p. – was cast for the first few episodes of the new season. Most of these major changes worked quite well, and most viewers at home would not have been too aware of the changes to the visual quality of the show (such as using tape instead of film).

But, as Executive Producer John Wild humorously pointed out, "the ratings didn't change one point!"  Channel Nine commissioned more surveys that told them the show needed to appeal to younger viewers. So two new characters were added, played by Daniel Frederiksen and Jacinta Stapleton, and, John Wild said, "and the ratings still didn't change one point!"  Channel Nine insisted that still more star power was needed to lift the ratings, so Lisa Chappell (Logie winning McLeod's Daughters star) joined the cast. After still no improvement to the ratings, more star power was further added in guest roles with Bill Hunter, Gigi Edgley, Steve Bisley, Tottie Goldsmith.  No improvement still.

Stingers was then "rested" for a couple of weeks and replaced by repeats of CSI: Crime Scene Investigation, and these repeats rated better than first-run episodes of Stingers (screening a repeat episode of CSI probably costs the network about $25,000 as opposed to a first-run episode of Stingers at $350,000).

It became clear what Nine would do: move Stingers to 10.30pm on a permanent basis and put higher-rating repeats of CSI on at 9.30 p.m. Channel Nine in Adelaide did not like this move and moved Stingers to 9:30 Monday nights, however this only lasted for five weeks before it was moved back to 10:30 on a Tuesday night; such a move to a later timeslot caused Stingers’ ratings to drop even lower, giving Nine reason to finally end the show. Stingers’ curse seemed to be that it always rated well, but it never rated spectacularly.

Plot

Inspired by true events, Stingers chronicled the cases of a deep undercover unit of the Victoria police. The series also followed their personal lives, which sometimes became intertwined with their jobs. The original unit was composed of Senior Detective Peter Church (whose real name was Mike Fischer) played by Peter Phelps, Senior Detective Angie Piper (Kate Kendall), Constable Oscar Stone (whose real name was Cameron Pierce) played by Ian Stenlake, Det-Sgt. Ellen 'Mac' Mackenzie (Anita Hegh) and Det-Sen Sgt. Bernie Rocca (Joe Petruzzi), who led the unit. Rocca was shot and left the unit in season two, and Mac became the new head.

Constable Danni Mayo (Roxane Wilson) joined the unit in season three, while season five saw two casualties: Stone was killed while Mac ran away with a diamond robber. Detective Inspector Luke Harris (Gary Sweet) took over as head of the unit until the end of the series, and Danni quit the force after being enraged by him. Constable Christina Dichiera (Jacinta Stapleton) joined the unit in season six. Her real name is Felicity Matthews, but this was not known to the force, as she had a criminal history under that name. Senior Detective Leo Flynn (Daniel Frederiksen) joined in season seven.

Season eight saw the arrival of Detective Katherine Marks, who was revealed as Harris' daughter from his first marriage. The revelation also ended Harris and Angie's already shaky relationship, which had produced a son.

 Episodes 

Season One (1998–99)

Season Two (1999)

Season Three (2000)

Season Four (2001)

Season Five (2002)

Season Six (2002)

Season Seven (2003–04)

Season Eight (2004)

Series ratings

Home Media
2006–2009: Beyond Home Entertainment released Seasons 1–8 as individual Season DVDs.

2013: Beyond Home Entertainment released Stingers: The Complete Collection Boxset.

2016: Beyond Home Entertainment released Stingers: Season 1 & 2 Collectors set.

2020: In August 9now will start streaming the complete series.

Awards and nominations

AwardsAustralian Film Institute Television Awards:

Best Television Drama Series (2004)
Best Performance by an Actor in a Guest Role in a Television Drama Series – Chris Haywood for the episode "Men in the Dark" (2000)Logie Awards:

Most Popular Actor – Peter Phelps (2002)

NominationsAustralian Film Institute Television Awards:
Best Actress in a Supporting or Guest Role in a Television Drama or Comedy – Jacinta Stapleton (2004)
Best Direction in Television – Grant Brown (2004)
Best Screenplay in Television – Matt Ford (2004)
Best Television Drama Series (2003)
Best Actor in a Guest Role in a Television Drama Series – Travis McMahon for the episode "Rich Man's World" (2001)
Best Performance by an Actress in a Guest Role in a Television Drama Series – Rhondda Findleton for the episode "Fool To Want You" (2001)
Best Performance by an Actor in a Guest Role in a Television Drama Series – Aaron Blabey for the episode "Second Chance" (2000)
Best Performance by an Actor in a Guest Role in a Television Drama Series – Daniel Daperis for the episode "Forced Perspective" (2000)
Best Performance by an Actress in a Leading Role in a Television Drama Series – Anita Hegh (2000)Logie Awards':

Most Outstanding Drama Series (2005)
Most Popular New Female Talent – Katrina Milosevic (2004)
Most Popular New Male Talent – Daniel Frederiksen (2004)
Most Outstanding Actor in a Drama Series – Gary Sweet (2004)
Most Outstanding Actress in a Drama Series – Kate Kendall (2004)
Most Outstanding Actor in a Drama Series – Gary Sweet (2003)
Most Outstanding Drama Series (2001)

References

External links

STINGERS: Undercover Central
Stingers at the National Film and Sound Archive
 
Stingers – "Ratcatcher" at Australian Screen Online

1998 Australian television series debuts
2004 Australian television series endings
1990s Australian crime television series
2000s Australian crime television series
1990s Australian drama television series
Television shows set in Victoria (Australia)
Nine Network original programming
Television series by Beyond Television Productions
2000s Australian drama television series